Silverdale is an unincorporated community in Silverdale Township, Cowley County, Kansas, United States.  As of the 2020 census, the population of the community and nearby areas was 61.

History
The post office was established June 5, 1871, and temporarily closed October 19, 1883 before being reopened December 12, 1883. It was permanently closed on July 31, 1964. 

In 1912, Silverdale was described as a hamlet with a hotel, general store, bank, and other businesses, and in 1910 the population was 100.   Today only a church and limestone quarry remain with perhaps a dozen residences. The quarry specialized in fine cut, quality limestone.

Geography
Silverdale is located in southern Kansas, between U.S. Route 166 and the Oklahoma state line. It is about 8 miles east of Arkansas City and is near the Arkansas River.

Demographics

For statistical purposes, the United States Census Bureau has defined Silverdale as a census-designated place (CDP).

Economy
Silverdale Quality Stone is the only business in the community, which dates back to 1874.

Education
The community is served by Arkansas City USD 470 public school district.

References

Further reading

External links
 Cowley County maps: Current, Historic, KDOT

Unincorporated communities in Cowley County, Kansas
Unincorporated communities in Kansas